Mirza Yusuf died 22October 1469) was the last sultan of the Qara Qoyunlu, also known as the Black Sheep Turkomans, to have significant authority.

During reign of Jahan Shah 
Mirza Yusuf was a son of Jahan Shah. He was appointed as governor of Fars after the revolt of his elder brother, Pir Budaq, in 1464. However, he was captured on 11 November 1467 at the Battle of Chapakchur by Uzun Hasan and blinded.

Reign 
He was declared sultan by Pir Ali Beg Baharlu, Jahan Shah's amir-al-umara and minister, in 1468. He was soon joined by Sultan Ali (the son of Hasan Ali) and a rival prince of the Aq Qoyunlu, Mahmud beg (the son of Qara Osman). They had some military successes in Luristan. However, Mirza Yusuf was soon defeated by Uzun Hasan and had to retreat to Shiraz, where he was killed by Uzun Hasan's son Ughurlu Muhammad on 22October 1469. Pir Ali Beg Baharlu fled to the court of Hasan Bayqara.

Family 
Mirza Yusuf's daughter Khadija Begum married Alvand Mirza's son Pir Quli Beg. Their grandson Quli Qutb Mulk later founded the Qutb Shahi dynasty of India.

References 

1469 deaths
Qara Qoyunlu rulers